The Immigrant Workers Centre (IWC)  is a social justice organization based in Montreal, Québec, Canada. Its goal is to defend the rights of immigrants in their workplaces through a community labour approach, serving as a resource and education centre that undertakes services, advocacy, and organizing relevant to the needs and interests of immigrant and migrant workers.

Mission statement 

The Immigrant Workers Centre defends the rights of migrant and immigrant workers. The organization's main objectives are to improve the working conditions of the immigrants and to offer them referrals regarding issues at work such as harassment, threat, workplace accident, lack of paid vacation and overtime, or maternity leave. The IWC has a community labour approach, as its goal is to educate not only the immigrant workers but also the population in general on the situation.

History 

The IWC was founded in 2000 by a small group of Filipino-Canadian workers and their allies. The idea of a centre came from the experience of two of the founders: Tess Tesalona and Marco Luciano. Both had previously worked as union organizers and became aware of the lack of resources available to immigrant workers. The goal of the centre was therefore to provide a place for workers to talk about their situations and provide a critique of unions  A year after its creation, the Immigrant Worker Centre received a grant from the social-justice fund of the Canadian Auto Workers and was able to expand the scope of its activity to address broader immigrant workers' issues by providing educational tools and critical analysis beyond the concern of the unions.

Current activities 

The Immigrant Workers Centre offers a broad range of activities to immigrant workers and their communities. The organization helps union organizing in workplaces with an important proportion of immigrants. The IWC also provides individual-rights counselling and workshops on issues like the history of labor movement. In addition, it has offered a program called “Skills for Change”, which teaches computer literacy and gives immigrants the opportunity to learn how to create, format, and edit documents, and become skilled in the use of the Internet. The program also incorporates information on labour rights in Canada and general social policy education. The Immigrant Workers Centre launched, in 2005, a community festival called MayWorks, dedicated to teaching the community about the struggles of immigrant women through artistic projects. The cultural event took place on Women's day and the centre's goal is to raise awareness to the condition of immigrant women by repeating the festival every year.

Following the Haiti earthquake of 2010, the IWC joined with UFCW Canada and made a donation of $10,000 to Doctors Without Borders in order to assist in the relief efforts. “As an organization that works to further migrant rights, we pledge to continue to work in solidarity with the Haitian community of Montreal to support workers’ rights as Haitian workers struggle to aid their family and friends back home", declared Jill Hanley from the Immigrant Workers Centre regarding the IWC's donation

Campaigns 

The IWC's campaigns are usually the result of workers seeking the help of the center for specific, personal issues. The first campaign of the IWC occurred in 2000 and aimed to prevent the deportation of a domestic worker, Melca Salvador, who was admitted to Canada under the Live-In Caregiver Program. The IWC helped Salvador win her case and brought the issue of importing immigrant labourers to the public sphere.

	The second campaign conducted by the Immigrant Workers Centre concerned the Labour Standards Act. Since most immigrant workers are not unionized, the Act represents their rights and is one of the only resources available to them. In 2002, the IWC and several other social justice groups started a campaign in order to reform the Act and succeed in including the coverage of domestic workers. Although the campaign was considered an important victory, the Labour Standard Act still has many flaws that the Immigrant Workers Center has not been able to change.

The Immigrant Workers Centre initiated many actions related to the North-to-South relocation of production trend that occurred in Montreal since 2003; this tendency resulted in several job losses without proper compensation, especially affecting immigrant employees. The first accomplishment of the centre was to convince the Montreal Jazz Festival to stop selling T-shirts manufactured by Gildan because of their factory closures in Montreal and poor labour practices in locally and in Honduras. The festival consequently adopted an "ethical buying" policy. L’Amour Inc. also followed that pattern of transfers and started to close its operations in the city around 2006 and relocated its factories in South America. Over 600 jobs were lost in the process and former employees, most of whom were immigrants, did not receive compensation. In 2007, a group of workers, unexpectedly laid off by L’Amour Inc., went to the Immigrant Workers Center seeking for help. The campaign eventually expanded to include 70 workers protesting their situation and seeking compensation for years of service. In 2008, the IWC allied with the UNITE HERE union to help laid off workers of manufacturing company Golden Brand get compensation. The company eventually agreed to give $3.5 million to its 540 previous employees but, while this was a historic victory in the clothing industry, most of them still face unemployment  On June 12, 2009, the IWC and former textile workers organized a rally at the National Assembly of Quebec to meet with Minister of Employment Sam Hamad and asked for better regulations and retraining programs. Although Hamad promised to remedy the situation and find employment for the laid off immigrant workers, no solutions were actually put in place.

Research and publication 

The Immigrant Workers Centre has conducted research, mostly based on real cases brought to them, including the Report on Systemic Discrimination: Employment and Poverty in 2000. In 2009, the book Fight Back: Workplace Justice for Immigrants was published. Drawing on the experience of 50 foreign workers, the book relates the challenges they face when trying to join the workforce in Canada, the exploitation they are victimized by, as well as organizing and activist experiences.

References 

Organizations based in Montreal
Immigrant rights organizations
Organizations established in 2000
2000 establishments in Quebec